Lison is a commune in the Calvados department in the Normandy region in northwestern France.

Population

Notable people
 Fernande Albany (1889 – 1966), actress, born in Lison.

Today 

There is a train station, Lison station, which has frequent services to Caen, Saint-Lô and Cherbourg. There are many small supermarkets and restaurants.

See also
Communes of the Calvados department

References

Communes of Calvados (department)
Calvados communes articles needing translation from French Wikipedia